Inverbervie (formerly just Bervie) in Kincardineshire was a royal burgh that elected one commissioner to the Parliament of Scotland and to the Convention of Estates.

After the Acts of Union 1707, Inverbervie, Aberdeen, Arbroath, Brechin and Montrose formed the Aberdeen district of burghs, returning one member between them to the House of Commons of Great Britain.

List of burgh commissioners
 1612: Arthur Rae
 1670: Robert Carnegie
 1672–74: Andrew Cuming
 1678: John Ayton
 1681–82: Alexander Man
 1685–86, 1689 (convention), 1689–1702: William Beattie, bailie
 1702–1707: Alexander Arbuthnott, after 1704 known as  Alexander Maitland

In 1707 Maitland was chosen to be one of the Scottish representatives to the first Parliament of Great Britain.

See also
 List of constituencies in the Parliament of Scotland at the time of the Union

References
 Joseph Foster, Members of Parliament, Scotland, 1882.

Constituencies of the Parliament of Scotland (to 1707)
Politics of the county of Kincardine
History of Aberdeenshire
Constituencies disestablished in 1707
1707 disestablishments in Scotland
Inverbervie